Allen Millyard from Thatcham, Berkshire, England, is an engineer and custom motorcycle builder for over 25 years, having created specials including winning best in show at Salon Privee for the world's smallest V-Twin, a Honda SS50-based V-twin, to one of the world's largest, his Flying Millyard. Another large capacity bike he hand-made is the Millyard Viper, built around an eight-litre V10 engine from a Dodge Viper. He has built several Kawasaki specials, both two and four strokes and some of those bikes are now on display at the Barber Museum, located in Barber Motorsports Park in Birmingham, Alabama, US.

In recent years he has become even more well known via his TV appearances with Henry Cole.

References

Motorcycle builders
Year of birth missing (living people)
People from Thatcham
Living people